it is no longer active (February 2023).

Into The Light Indonesia is a youth-based community with the focus as a center of advocacy, research, and education related to suicide prevention and mental health issues in Indonesia. The community was founded by Benny Prawira in 2013 and established with the mission to promote awareness of suicide prevention, especially in Indonesia.

History
After discovered an unusually high rate of suicide in Indonesia during 2012, Benny Prawira Siauw, the founder, along with four of his friends formed an ad-hoc committee to commemorate 2013 World Suicide Prevention Day which was named "Into The Light". The committee was later formed as a community with the focus for suicide prevention for youth and special population groups.

One of the community's program involves researches related to suicide in Indonesia. The community has stated that the researches about suicide in Indonesia is very limited.

The community is actively referred as one of the leading mental health community or NGO in Indonesia, with notable support from Indonesian Ministry of Health, LBH Pers, dan Indonesian Alliance of Independent Journalists.

In 2017, the community opened a peer counseling service, where people with suicidal thoughts may send an email for seeking help. However, the service was closed in April 2018 and remain closed until now.

In 2018, the community launched a podcast Diskusi Psikologi (Disko) taken in collaboration with Kantor Berita Radio (KBR) which discusses mental health issues, spoken in Indonesian.

References 

Non-profit organizations based in Indonesia